Severino Nardozzi (born 4 June 1946) is an Italian racing driver.

References

1946 births
Living people
Italian racing drivers
International Formula 3000 drivers
Place of birth missing (living people)
20th-century Italian people

Durango drivers